Urticina eques is a species of sea anemone in the family Actiniidae. It is commonly known as the white-spotted rose anemone or strawberry anemone.

Taxonomy
According to one authority, the populations of Urticina eques found in the Pacific Ocean are not the same species as those in the Atlantic Ocean and should instead be considered to be conspecific with Cribrinopsis albopunctata, a new species from Kamchatka.

Description

Urticina eques has a smooth, red column with vertical rows of white tubercles. In contrast to other similar species, the tubercles are not adhesive and do not normally attract gravel and shell fragments. There are no acontia with stinging nematocysts protruding through the body wall. The oral disk is plain red and the tapering tentacles are red and have no transverse striations.

Distribution and habitat

Urticina eques is found in the North Atlantic Ocean and the Pacific coast of North America. It is found on rocks and pilings, in crevices and gullies and favours exposed habitats with fast moving water.

Biology

Urticina eques is dioecious. In California, female ripeness occurs in December as the sea temperature begins to fall. The large eggs,  in diameter, are produced at intervals, and the release of sperm by the males follows shortly afterwards. In some females, large oocytes also release eggs at other times of year. The gametes emerge through the mouth of the anemone and fertilisation is external. The eggs develop into planula larvae which drift with the current before settling and growing into new individuals.

Ecology
Juveniles of the painted greenling, a species of fish, have a facultative association with Urticina eques. They are often found among the tentacles or close to the column, especially when resting and inactive at night. According to researcher Joel Elliot, these associations occurred mainly in moderately exposed locations where the sea anemones and fish were both numerous; the large anemone offers the fish protection from predators and provides a safe environment for it to feed on copepods and other small invertebrates that are also associated with the anemone. The research indicated that the fish seemed to be unharmed by the anemone's nematocysts. The anemones themselves were thought not to derive any benefits from the arrangement.

References

Actiniidae
Animals described in 1858